Hank Williams Jr. & Friends is the twenty-sixth studio album by Hank Williams Jr.

Composition 
Hank Williams Jr. & Friends is Williams' breakthrough album, featuring Williams' own unique style as opposed to imitating his father's. The album's sound has been classified as country rock, southern rock and outlaw country.

Production
According to Williams' autobiography, Living Proof, the album was recorded in Muscle Shoals, Alabama, at Music Mill Studios between February and July 1975. The album insert says that this was recorded at Capricorn Studios in Macon, Georgia.

Release 

The album was issued by MGM Records as number M3G5009 and was later reissued by Polydor Records as number 831 575-4 Y-1. It was also reissued on CD in 2000 by Mercury Records, a division of UMG Recordings, Inc.

Critical reception 
The Village Voice critic Robert Christgau said, "The authority of Williams' voice and persona, plus the good sense of his songwriting and selection, focuses an Allman and a Marshall Tucker and a Charlie Daniels into what I'm sure will stand as the best Southern-style rock of the year." Years later, the Allmusic editor, Thom Jurek cited, Hank Williams Jr. & Friends as "one of the best country-rock albums ever made and stands with the best of the outlaw recordings of the era".

Track listing

Personnel
Credits are adapted from the album's 2000 Mercury Records reissue liner notes.
 Hank Williams Jr – lead vocals
 Jerry Wallace – acoustic guitar
 Gary Boggs – steel guitar
 Pete Carr – lead guitar
 Lenny LeBlanc – bass guitar
 Roger Clark – drums
 Ronnie Oldham – piano, keyboards
 Ken Bell – acoustic guitar
 Dick Overby – steel guitar
 Charlie Daniels – fiddle on "Losin' You"
 Toy Caldwell – steel guitar on "Montana Song" and "Can't You See"
 Chuck Leavell – organ on "On Susan's Floor"
 Harmony vocalists – Sue Richards, Dick Glasser, Ava Aldridge, Jim Glaser, Eddie Struzick, George Soule, Lenny LeBlanc

References

External links
 Hank Williams Jr's official website

1975 albums
Hank Williams Jr. albums
Albums produced by Dick Glasser
MGM Records albums
Polydor Records albums